Kareh-ye Mian Rud-e Zaruni (also Romanized as Kareh-ye Mīān Rūd-e Ẕarūnī; also known as Kareh-ye Ẕarūnī and Korreh) is a village in Kuhdasht-e Jonubi Rural District, in the Central District of Kuhdasht County, Lorestan Province, Iran. At the 2006 census, its population was 121, in 23 families.

References 

Towns and villages in Kuhdasht County